The southern pig-tailed macaque (Macaca nemestrina), also known as the Sundaland pig-tailed macaque and Sunda pig-tailed macaque, is a medium-sized macaque that lives in southern Thailand, Malaysia, and Indonesia. It is known locally as berok.

Etymology and taxonomy 
The species epithet, nemestrina, is an adjective (derived from Latin Nemestrinus, meaning "the god of groves") modified to agree in gender with the feminine generic name. M. nemestrina formerly included the northern pig-tailed, Pagai Island, and Siberut macaques as subspecies. All four are now considered separate species.

Description 
This macaque has buff-brown fur, with a darker dorsal area and lighter ventral area. Its common name refers to the short tail held semi-erect, resembling the tail of a pig.

Behaviour and ecology 
M. nemestrina is mainly terrestrial, but also a skilled climber. Unlike almost all primates, these macaques love water. They live in large groups that split into smaller groups during daytime when they are foraging. They are omnivorous, feeding mainly on fruits, seeds, berries, cereals, fungi, and invertebrates. A study in peninsular Malaysia found them to be the primary, and perhaps the only, seed dispersers of the rattan species Daemonorops calicarpa and Calamus castaneus.

There is a hierarchy among males, based on strength, and among females, based on heredity. Thus, the daughter of the alpha female will immediately be placed above all other females in the group. The alpha female leads the group, while the male role is more to manage conflict within the group and to defend it.

Female gestation lasts around 5.7 months. She will give birth to one infant every two years. Weaning occurs at 4–5 months. Sexual maturity is reached at 3–5 years. 

In Thailand, they have been trained for 400 years to harvest coconuts.

Habitat and distribution
This macaque is mostly found in rainforest up to 2000 meters, but will also enter plantations and gardens.

It is found in the southern half of the Malay Peninsula (only just extending into southernmost Thailand), Borneo, Sumatra and Bangka Island.  There are reports of the species having been present in Singapore before 1950, but these were likely escaped pets.  The only pig-tailed macaques in Singapore today are introduced monkeys.

Forced Labor Allegations

Usage of monkeys to harvest coconuts, in South East Asia has been documented since the 19th century.
Peta says that it had investigated Thai coconut farms and found chained monkeys that were forced to spend long hours climbing trees and picking coconut. Vincent Nijman, anthropology professor and head of the Oxford Wildlife Trade Research Group at Oxford Brookes University, who has researched the welfare of coconut-harvesting macaques in Thailand, said the practice is largely confined to the southernmost part of Thailand and involves the northern and southern pig-tailed macaques. It is probably the case that such monkeys are based on small farms catering to local consumption, rather than farms that produce coconuts for exports. The practice in Thailand of using monkey labor to pick coconuts is slowly dying, says Edwin Weik, the founder of Wildlife Friends Foundation Thailand. In 2021, He estimated that 15 years ago, as many as 15,000 monkeys labored on coconut farms, compared to the 3,000 then.

References

Maestripieri D, 1999. Changes in Social Behavior and Their Hormonal Correlates during Pregnancy in Pig-tailed Macaques. International Journal of Primatology 20 : 707-718.
Rodman PS, 1991. Structural differentiation of microhabitats of sympatricmacaca fascicularis andM. nemestrina in East Kalimantan, Indonesia. International Journal of Primatology 12 : 357-375.
Oi T, 1990. Patterns of dominance and affiliation in wild pig-tailed macaques (Macaca nemestrina nemestrina) in West Sumatra. International Journal of Primatology 11 : 339-356.

External links 

 ARKive - images and movies of the Sunda pig-tailed macaque (Macaca nemestrina)
Biolib

southern pig-tailed macaque
Primates of Southeast Asia
southern pig-tailed macaque
Taxa named by Carl Linnaeus